Consorsbank is a brand of BNP Paribas S.A. Niederlassung Deutschland with its seat in Nürnberg.

Activities 

As a direct bank, Consorsbank offers its full range of products online.

They include a current account, with two free debit cards (one V PAY and one Visa Debit card). Customers can additionally request for a yearly fee a Visa credit card (Visa Card Gold), which offers them credit and additional benefits such as free ATM withdrawals and payments worldwide, mobile phone insurance and travel insurance.

Consorsbank's saving products include a money market account, saving plans and time deposits.

Additionally Consorsbank offers an online trading platform that lets them trade on financial products from various global markets.

History 

In December 2014 Cortal Consors Germany was rebranded as Consorsbank. In November 2016 it absorbed DAB Bank that BNP Paribas had acquired in 2014 with all customer accounts being transferred to Consorsbank.

External links 
 Official Website

References

Banks of Germany